Grant County is a county in the U.S. state of Arkansas. Its population was 17,958 at the 2020 United States Census. The county seat is Sheridan.

Grant County is included in the Little Rock–North Little Rock–Conway, AR Metropolitan Statistical Area.

History
Formed on February 4, 1869, Grant County was named in honor of U.S. President-elect  Ulysses S. Grant. It is an alcohol prohibition or dry county.

Robert W. Glover, a Missionary Baptist pastor who served in both houses of the Arkansas General Assembly (1905-1912) from Sheridan, introduced in 1909 the resolution calling for the establishment of four state agricultural colleges. His brother, David Delano Glover, a Methodist, was a state representative in the 1907 session and a member of the United States House of Representatives from 1929 to 1935, having been unseated in 1934 by  Grant County native John Little McClellan who at the time was practicing law in Camden. McClellan later went on to become Arkansas's longest serving U.S. senator.

Geography
Grant County is considered part of the Arkansas Timberlands geographical area.

Major highways
 U.S. Highway 167
 U.S. Highway 270
 Highway 35
 Highway 46

Adjacent counties
 Saline County (north)
 Pulaski County (northeast)
 Jefferson County (east)
 Cleveland County (southeast)
 Dallas County (south)
 Hot Spring County (west)

Demographics

2020 census

As of the 2020 United States census, there were 17,958 people, 6,863 households, and 5,007 families residing in the county.

2000 census
As of the 2000 census, there were 16,464 people, 4,241 households, and 4,780 families residing in the county. There were 6,960 housing units at an average density of 11 per square mile (4/km2). The racial makeup of the county was 95.55% White, 2.47% Black or African American, 0.45% Native American, 0.13% Asian, 0.03% Pacific Islander, 0.64% from other races, and 0.73% from two or more races.  1.15% of the population were Hispanic or Latino of any race.

There were 6,241 households, out of which 35.60% had children under the age of 18 living with them, 64.70% were married couples living together, 8.50% had a female householder with no husband present, and 23.40% were non-families. 20.40% of all households were made up of individuals, and 9.00% had someone living alone who was 65 years of age or older.  The average household size was 2.61 and the average family size was 3.00.

In the county, the population was spread out, with 25.90% under the age of 18, 8.00% from 18 to 24, 29.60% from 25 to 44, 24.30% from 45 to 64, and 12.20% who were 65 years of age or older.  The median age was 37 years. For every 100 females, there were 98.50 males.  For every 100 females age 18 and over, there were 96.30 males.

The median income for a household in the county was $37,182, and the median income for a family was $42,901. Males had a median income of $31,842 versus $22,098 for females. The per capita income for the county was $17,547.  About 7.80% of families and 10.20% of the population were below the poverty line, including 12.50% of those under age 18 and 13.00% of those age 65 or over.

The largest self-identified ancestry groups in Grant County, Arkansas are:

 30.1% English
 12.0% American
 9.5% Irish
 8.9% German
 1.4% Italian
 1.2% Polish
 1.1% French
 0.7% Swedish

Government
Over The past few election cycles Grant county has trended heavily towards the GOP. The last democrat (as of 2020) to carry this county was Bill Clinton in 1996.

Communities

Cities
 Leola
 Prattsville
 Sheridan (county seat)

Towns
 Poyen
 Tull

Townships

 Calvert (small part of Sheridan)
 Darysaw
 Davis
 Dekalb (Tull)
 Fenter (Poyen)
 Franklin
 Madison
 Merry Green (most of Sheridan)
 River (Prattsville)
 Simpson
 Tennessee (Leola)
 Washington

Culture
Grant County is home to Jenkins' Ferry Battleground State Park.

See also

 List of dry counties in Arkansas
 List of counties in Arkansas
 List of lakes in Grant County, Arkansas
 National Register of Historic Places listings in Grant County, Arkansas

References

 
1869 establishments in Arkansas

Little Rock–North Little Rock–Conway metropolitan area
Populated places established in 1869